AbaQulusi Local Municipality is a local municipality in Zululand in the KwaZulu-Natal province of South Africa. It is named after the AbaQulusi, a Zulu clan whose descendants live in the vicinities of Vryheid, Utrecht, eDumbe and Ngotshe. They hailed from different origins but were unified by their allegiance to local Zulu royal homesteads. Historically they were not drafted into ordinary "amabutho" regiments but rather into a royal section, and no "umnumzane" chief presented them in the Zulu king's council.

Towns and settlements
63% of the population of the AbaQulusi municipal area live in rural areas, most of which live in scattered homesteads known as imizi in tribal areas.  Homesteads are of a mixed nature, including both modern dwellings and traditional thatched huts.  The remainder of the population lives as tenants on farm or in towns, dormitory townships and shacks in the settlements around towns.

Vryheid is Zululand's main commercial, industrial and business centre, with a reasonably well-developed physical, social and institutional infrastructure.  It is located at the intersection of the major transport routes (R34 and R69) that traverse the region.

Other towns and settlements within the municipal boundaries include: Alpha, Calvert, Emondlo, Esigodini, Gluckstadt, Hlobane, Kandaspunt, Lenjanedrif, Louwsburg, Ngobeni, Ngome, Scheepersnek, Steilrand, Stilwater, Swart Umfolozi, Thakazele, and Zungwini.

The main nodal points of the AbaQulusi Municipal area are:

Vryheid with its central business district and surrounding residential area, together with its former black township Bhekuzulu;
Louwsburg, an independent settlement area some 67 km northeast of Vryheid and at the entrance to the Ithala Game Reserve;
Hlobane and Coronation, which have become ghost towns due to decline of the coal mining, and other similar settlements located 25  km to the east of Vryheid;
eMondlo and the surrounding Tribal Area of Hlahlindlela southwest of Vryheid;
Khambi Tribal Area and surrounding settlements in the southeastern part of the Municipal area;
Glückstadt and surrounding settlements in the southern part of the Municipal area;
Boschhoek and surrounding settlements in the central part of the Municipal area;
and a number of rural settlement areas around Brakfontein between eMondlo and Vryheid in the western part of the Municipal area.

Economy
Currently the agricultural sector provides the highest proportion of the Gross Geographic Product (GGP) of the AbaQulusi area, even though the area is classified as having low agricultural potential. According to a land potential analysis of the area, only 15% of agricultural land can be described as having high agricultural potential. There is extensive, but not intensive agriculture. Very few farms are irrigated.

Products produced are timber, field crops and livestock.  Current products farmed include maize, groundnuts, soya beans, sunflowers, fruits and sorghum.

Coal mining historically provided a major force in the local economy of Northern KwaZulu Natal. However, over the past 15 years a number of mines in the area ceased operation, negatively impacting the regional economy. The AbaQulusi Municipality was particularly affected by the closure of the Coronation, Mnyathi, and Hlobane mines in 1997 and 1998.  Recently, the coal mining sector seems to have regained some momentum and it is coming back to dominate the economic sector.

Manufacturing in the municipal area includes food and beverages, clothing and textiles, leather products, paper and paper products, printing and publishing, metal products, machinery and equipment.

Wetlands of national importance abound in the district, with Blood River Vlei being the most important.  Over 370 species of birds and many animals, reptiles, insects, amphibians and plants can be seen here, creating a significant potential for ecotourism in the area.

Politics 

The municipal council consists of forty-five members elected by mixed-member proportional representation. Twenty-three councillors are elected by first-past-the-post voting in twenty-three wards, while the remaining twenty-two are chosen from party lists so that the total number of party representatives is proportional to the number of votes received. 

In the election of 1 November 2021 no party obtained a majority. The Inkatha Freedom Party (IFP) obtained a plurality of twenty-one seats. The following table shows the results of the election.

Challenges
The number of individuals infected with HIV/AIDS continues to be a major challenge.  HIV/AIDS infections in Abaqulusi grew from 3.97% in 1995 to 19% in 2007. There was a substantial increase (49.89%) in deaths that were due to HIV/AIDS between 1995 and 2007. In 1995, 160 deaths were due to HIV/AIDS and in 2007 there were 2383 HIV/AIDS deaths. Thus in 2007, 41.13% of all reported deaths were due to HIV/AIDS (Abaqulusi Municipality LED Sector Plan, 2009).  The HIV and AIDS prevalence rate for the KwaZulu-Natal province as a whole is estimated at 39%. As a result, without proper nutrition, health care and medicine that is available in developed countries, large numbers of people suffer and die from AIDS-related complications. In some areas, the epidemic has left behind many orphans cared for by elderly grandparents.  HIV/AIDS also severely retards economic growth by destroying human capital.

Education levels in the area are very low, with 22% of the population having no formal education. 60.15% of the population has some form of primary or secondary education, but only 2.54% have had any further education. Consequently, one of the key challenges facing AbaQulusi Municipality is a relatively high rate of functional illiteracy. This has a significant impact on employability, the type of job opportunities that can be sought and the vocational distribution of the economically active population. The urban centres within AbaQulusi present a slightly better picture with regard to education levels, but generally the skills base remains low.

Main places
The 2001 census divided the municipality into the following main places:

References

External links
 Abaqulusi Municipality Official Website

Local municipalities of the Zululand District Municipality